Only Time Will Tell may refer to:

 Only Time Will Tell (Sandeé album), 1991
 Only Time Will Tell (Ian Gomm and Jeb Loy Nichols album), 2010 
 "Only Time Will Tell" (song), a 1982 song by Asia
 "Only Time Will Tell", a song by John Cale from Sabotage/Live
 "Only Time Will Tell", a song by Ill Bill from The Hour of Reprisal
 "Only Time Will Tell", a song by Jimmy Buffett from Banana Wind
 "Only Time Will Tell", a song by Mike Oldfield from The Songs of Distant Earth
 "Only Time Will Tell", a song by Nelson
 "Only Time Will Tell", a song by Saga from Wildest Dreams
 "Only Time Will Tell (novel), a 2011 novel by Jeffrey Archer